Gundak-e Molla (also Romanized as Gūndak-e Mollā; also known as Gondak-e Mollā and Gondūk-e Mollā) is a village in Beradust Rural District, Sumay-ye Beradust District, Urmia County, West Azerbaijan Province, Iran. At the 2006 census, its population was 198, in 38 families.

References 

Populated places in Urmia County